is a Japanese television and film director.

Education 
Nobuhiro Doi graduated from Waseda University School of Economics and Politics.

Works

TV series
Aoi Tori (1997)
Majo no Jōken (1999)
Beautiful Life (2000)
Strawberry on the Shortcake (2001)
Friends (2002, miniseries)
Season of the Sun (2002s)
Good Luck!! (2003)
Nemuri no Mori (2014)
Kōnodori (2015-2017)
Quartet (2017)
In This Corner of the World (2018)

Film
Be with You (2004)
Nada Sōsō (2006)
Hanamizuki (2010)
The Wings of the Kirin (2012)
Flying Colors (2015)
The Voice of Sin (ja) (2020)
We Made a Beautiful Bouquet (ja) (2021)
Kataomoi Sekai (2024)

References

External links

Living people
Japanese film directors
Japanese television directors
Year of birth missing (living people)